Mia Rej (born 2 February 1990) is a Danish handball player for Odense Håndbold and the Danish national team.

She made her debut on the national team on 9 March 2016 against Russia.

She represented Denmark at the 2019 World Women's Handball Championship.

References

External links

Danish female handball players
1990 births
Living people
Expatriate handball players
Danish expatriate sportspeople in Sweden
Handball players from Copenhagen